WDFC may refer to:

 WDFC-LP, a radio station in North Carolina
 Western Dedicated Freight Corridor
 WD-40 Company NASDAQ stock ticker